Zwem en Polo Club Het Ravijn is a Dutch water sports from Nijverdal club founded in 1961. It is best known for its women's water polo team, which has won four national championships since 2000. It reached the final of the Women's LEN Trophy in 2006 and 2011, but it lost them against Budapest Honvéd and Rapallo respectively.

Titles
 Men's water polo
 Dutch Cup (1)
 1995
 Women's water polo
 Dutch Championship (5)
 2000, 2003, 2008, 2012, 2013
 Dutch Cup (8)
 1995, 1996, 1997, 1999, 2006, 2007, 2008, 2010

Former internationals
Hellen Boering, Bert Brinkman, Rianne Guichelaar, Niels van der Kolk, Karin Kuipers, Meike de Nooy, Carla Quint, Yasemin Smit, Wyco de Vries, Lieke Schokker-Klaassen

References

Water polo clubs in the Netherlands
LEN Women's Champions' Cup clubs
Sports clubs established in 1961
1961 establishments in the Netherlands
Sports clubs in Hellendoorn